Patrick Guillaume Ibanda (born 5 September 1978) is a retired Cameroonian football player.

Career
He played in Ukraine for FC Feniks-Illichovets Kalinine.

References

External links
Profile at FFU website

1978 births
Living people
Footballers from Douala
Cameroonian footballers
Association football midfielders
Union Douala players
Shooting Stars S.C. players
Mamelodi Sundowns F.C. players
Hapoel Rishon LeZion F.C. players
FC Vorskla Poltava players
FC Zorya Luhansk players
FC Kryvbas Kryvyi Rih players
FC Arsenal Kyiv players
Southern United FC players
Ukrainian Premier League players
Cameroonian expatriate footballers
Cameroonian expatriate sportspeople in Nigeria
Cameroonian expatriate sportspeople in South Africa
Cameroonian expatriate sportspeople in Israel
Cameroonian expatriate sportspeople in New Zealand
Cameroonian expatriate sportspeople in Ukraine
Expatriate footballers in Nigeria
Expatriate soccer players in South Africa
Expatriate footballers in Israel
Expatriate association footballers in New Zealand
Expatriate footballers in Ukraine